"Far Away" is a song by Canadian band Nickelback. First released on January 23, 2006, in Australia, it was the second international single and the fourth US single from the band's fifth album, All the Right Reasons (2005). "Far Away" peaked at number eight in the United States, making All the Right Reasons the only Nickelback album to date to have more than one top-10 hit. The band's lead singer and guitarist Chad Kroeger described this song on the Tour when in Australia as the "only real love song" that Nickelback has. He described many others as "being about love" but not solely about "being in love".

The song was re-released in the United Kingdom on September 22, 2008, following the success of "Rockstar" and the re-release of "Photograph". This release also reached number 40 in the UK singles chart, equalling its original chart peak, although this re-release was download-only.

Background 
"Far Away" was a huge success in the U.S. and became the band's fourth top ten single on the Billboard Hot 100, peaking at number 8. The song was the second top-10 single from their latest album All the Right Reasons after the leading single of the album, "Photograph", which peaked at number two on the chart.

Composition
The song is written in the key of B major and follows a slow tempo of 67 beats per minute in common time.  It follows a chord progression of Bmaj7FsusGm7E, and the vocals span from E3 to A4.  In the final chorus of the song, the key changes to D major.

Music video 
The music video for "Far Away" was first shown on VH1's V-Spot. Filmed at Green Timbers Park in Surrey, British Columbia just outside Vancouver, the video starts with a couple in bed, when a cellphone rings and the husband is forced to leave. It is revealed that he is a firefighter, and has been called to help fight a forest fire.

As the song moves on, we see the firefighters dropped right into the middle of the fire by a helicopter, which quickly overwhelms them and forces them to retreat. The husband goes back to help a fallen firefighter, and watches the helicopter leave without him. After the husband sees the helicopter leave, a large, fiery tree is seen falling, presumably onto him. This footage is inter-cut with his wife watching the news about the fire.

Later, she receives a phone call, and breaks down, as it appears that she has been informed that her husband has died. She rushes outside to see several firefighters emerge from a truck...including her husband, covered in soot. She rushes to him and hugs him, and the video ends.

The entire song also features inter-cuts to the band playing in a large, strobe light-filled red and orange room.

VH1 later named this video as the third-best song on the Top 40 Videos of 2006, behind "Hips Don't Lie" by Shakira and ahead of "SexyBack" by Justin Timberlake.

Track listings and formats
CD single (UK)
 "Far Away" [Album Version] – 4:01
 "Far Away" [Edit Version] – 3:42
 "Mistake" [Live in Edmonton] – 5:11
 "Photograph" [Acoustic] Rolling Stone Original – 6:55
 "Far Away" [Video]

CD single
 "Far Away" [Edit Version] – 3:42
 "Mistake" [Live in Edmonton] – 5:11
 "Photograph" [Acoustic] Rolling Stone Original – 6:55

Deluxe edition
 "Far Away" [Album Version] – 4:01
 "Far Away" [Edit Version] – 3:42

Charts

Weekly charts

Year-end charts

All-time charts

Certifications

Release history

References

Nickelback songs
2005 songs
2006 singles
Roadrunner Records singles
Songs containing the I–V-vi-IV progression
Songs written by Chad Kroeger
Songs written by Daniel Adair
Songs written by Mike Kroeger
Songs written by Ryan Peake